Elections to Liverpool City Council were held on 1 November 1947.
This was the last local election held at the beginning of November.

After the election, the composition of the council was:

Election result

Ward results

* - Councillor seeking re-election

(PARTY) - Party of former Councillor

Due to the disruption in elections caused by The Second World War no comparisons are made with other elections.

Abercromby

Aigburth

Allerton

Anfield

Breckfield

Brunswick

Castle Street

Childwall

Croxteth

Dingle

Edge Hill

Everton

Exchange

Fairfield

Fazakerley

Garston

Granby

Great George

Kensington

Kirkdale

Little Woolton

Low Hill

Much Woolton

Netherfield

North Scotland

Old Swan

Prince's Park

Sandhills

St. Anne's

St. Domingo

St. Peter's

Sefton Park East

Sefton Park West

South Scotland

Vauxhall

Walton

Warbreck

Wavertree

Wavertree West

West Derby

By-elections

Great George 20 January 1948

Caused by the resignation of Mr. Robert Edward Cottier (Labour, elected November 1945).

Kensington 15 April 1948

Caused by the death of Councillor Frederick Harold Bailey (Conservative, elected November 1946) on 24 February 1948

Walton 10 June 1948

Alderman James Graham Reece JP died on 24 March 1948'

Councillor Reginald Richard Bailey was elected as an Alderman by the Council on 5 May 1948.

Edge Hill 22 July 1948

Caused by the resignation of Arthur Leadbetter (Labour, elected November 1946)

Councillor James Bennett O.B.E. died on 24 September 1948.

Councillor James Forster Brakell died on 4 October 1948.

References

1947
1947 English local elections
City Council election, 1947
November 1947 events in the United Kingdom